Duan Yingying and Wang Yafan were the defending champions, but Wang chose to compete in Nanchang instead. Duan played alongside Zheng Saisai, but lost in the first round to Lesley Pattinama Kerkhove and Bibiane Schoofs.

Nicole Melichar and Květa Peschke won the title, defeating Yanina Wickmayer and Tamara Zidanšek in the final, 6–1, 7–6(7–2).

Seeds

Draw

Draw

References

External links
Draw

Zhengzhou Open - Doubles